Feeley may refer to:

People
A. J. Feeley, U.S. football player
Andy Feeley, English footballer
Camilla Feeley, U.S. gymnast
Don Feeley, basketball coach
Frank Feeley, automotive designer
John Feeley, Irish classical guitarist
John D. Feeley, U.S. diplomat
Myron Henry Feeley, Canadian politician
Kathleen Feeley, U.S. educator
Paul Feeley, artist
Tim McFeeley, U.S. gay rights activist
Tyler Feeley, Serbian-American soccer player

Places
Feeley Peak, Antarctica
Feeley Township, Minnesota - a township in the U.S. State of Minnesota